Stefano Sabelli (born 13 January 1993) is an Italian footballer who plays for  club Genoa.

Biography
Born in Rome, capital of Italy, Sabelli started his career at A.S. Roma. In July 2012 Sabelli left for A.S. Bari in a temporary deal. He wore no.2 shirt for his new team. Sabelli made his debut in 2012–13 Coppa Italia. On 21 June 2013 Bari excised the option to buy him in a co-ownership deal for €300,000. In June 2014 Bari acquired him outright for an additional €600,000.

On 21 January 2016 he was signed by Serie A struggler Carpi, in a temporary deal.

On 29 June 2018, he joined Serie B club Brescia.

On 19 January 2021, Sabelli joined Serie B club Empoli.

On 19 July 2021, Sabelli signed with Serie A club Genoa a 4-years contract. On 14 January 2022, he returned to Brescia on loan.

References

External links
 UEFA
 Lega Serie B Profile  

1993 births
Living people
Italian footballers
A.S. Roma players
S.S.C. Bari players
A.C. Carpi players
Brescia Calcio players
Empoli F.C. players
Genoa C.F.C. players
Serie A players
Serie B players
Italy under-21 international footballers
Italy youth international footballers
Association football defenders
Footballers from Rome